Ipomoea tuberculata is a flowering plant species in the bindweed family (Convolvulaceae). It belongs to the morning glory genus, Ipomoea.

Ipomoea tuberculata was first described by J. B. Ker Gawler in 1816. It can be confused with the plant described under the same name by J.J. Roemer and J. A. Schultes, but is I. cairica.

Description
The plant is annual and glabrous with slender and smooth stems.

Distribution
The plant is found throughout Africa and Asia including countries such as Somalia, Ethiopia and Eritrea as well as Namibia and northern Botswana. It is also common in Sri Lanka and India.

References

tuberculata
Flora of Africa
Flora of Asia
Plants described in 1816